Kim Thatcher (born 1964) is an American politician who served as member of the Oregon State Senate for the 13th district from 2015 to 2023. She previously served as a member of the Oregon House of Representatives for the 25th district from 2005 to 2015. She is a resident of Keizer.

Early life and education
Thatcher was born in Pocatello, Idaho, in 1964 and attended Portland State University.

Career
Thatcher was first elected to the Oregon House of Representatives in 2004, representing the Keizer area. Early in her career, as the owner of the highway construction firm KT Contracting, became known for her criticisms of the Oregon Department of Transportation. In May 2005, Thatcher successfully sponsored a bill to limit public access to information about concealed handgun license. She was reelected in 2006, 2008, 2010, and 2012. In 2014, Thatcher chose to run for a seat in the Oregon Senate, held by the retiring Larry George, rather than seek re-election to her house seat.

During Thatcher's 2014 campaign for state senator, she earned the endorsement of The Oregonian on October 9, 2014; she ultimately won the election. However, of The Oregonian had revoked the endorsement the day after giving it due to newly released reports showing companies she owned had lied about expenses submitted to ODOT for repayment, and then was found destroying evidence when records were requested in court proceedings. The rulings ended with a $60,000 court costs, and an assessment stating that while the company had willfully destroyed evidence, the resources needed to successfully prosecute a criminal case would require more than could be justified as an appropriate use. Thatcher was a delegate to the 2016 Republican National Convention, where she cast her vote for Donald Trump as the nominee. While she initially supported Ted Cruz, she ended the convention supporting Trump for president stating: "I can honestly say I feel less uncomfortable with Trump."

Legislation 
During the 79th Oregon Legislative Assembly, Thatcher served on the Transparency Advisory Commission. She was also a member of the General Government and Accountability Committee. During the current 81st Oregon Legislative Assembly, she serves on the Judiciary Committee.

Thatcher was one of several cosponsors of legislation in 2009 to establish an Oregon's first transparency website; the measure passed the Senate unanimously and was signed into law by then-Governor Ted Kulongoski. Thatcher was a chief sponsor of legislation signed into law in 2011 that expanded Oregon's transparency web site to include economic development tax incentives, and in 2013 was a sponsor of legislation that required the state transparency website to post additional materials, such as minutes or summaries of public meetings, additional state contracts, and information on tax expenditures under Oregon Low Income Community Jobs Initiatives. Thatcher was the sponsor of subsequent successful legislation in 2015 and 2017 that expanded the material on the state transparency website.

In 2017, Thatcher introduced a bill that would have required public universities and community colleges in Oregon to expel students convicted of rioting. Thatcher introduced similar legislation in 2011.

Thatcher participated in the 2019 Oregon Senate Republican walkouts.

On December 11, 2020, Thatcher and 11 other state Republican officials signed a letter requesting Oregon Attorney General Ellen Rosenblum join Texas and other states contesting the results of the 2020 presidential election in Texas v. Pennsylvania. Rosenblum announced she had filed in behalf of the defense, and against Texas, the day prior.

Thatcher has cast doubt on the validity of the 2020 United States presidential election results. Thatcher has falsely claimed that the Arizona audit showed evidence of fraud and has declined to state whether Joe Biden won the 2020 election. In October 2021, Thatcher signed a letter along with other Republican politicians calling for an audit of the 2020 election in all states and the elimination of voter rolls in every state.

2020 secretary of state campaign 

On February 10, 2020, Thatcher announced her campaign for the office of Oregon secretary of state in the 2020 general election. She defeated Dave Stauffer to become the Republican Party nominee on May 19, 2020, but lost (43.2%) to Democrat Shemia Fagan (50.3%).

References

External links
 Oregon House website
 Campaign website

1964 births
21st-century American politicians
21st-century American women politicians
Living people
Republican Party members of the Oregon House of Representatives
Republican Party Oregon state senators
People from Keizer, Oregon
Women state legislators in Oregon